T. S. Rawat may refer to:

 Tejpal Singh Rawat; retired Indian Army general and politician.
 Tirath Singh Rawat; 9th Chief Minister of Uttarakhand.
 Trivendra Singh Rawat; 8th Chief Minister of Uttarakhand.